Petar Misovski (Macedonian: Петар Мисовски) (born 4 Junel 1976) is a retired Macedonian handball player who has played for RK Pelister, Zamet Rijeka, RK Vardar, Nittedal, Merkur, Metalurg and Tinex Prolet and also he was playing for Macedonia national handball team.

Honours 
Pelister 
Macedonian Super League (2): 1997-98, 1999-00
Macedonian Cup (2): 1998, 1999 

Vardar
Macedonian Super League (2): 2002-03, 2003-04
Macedonian Cup (2): 2003, 2004

Metalurg
Macedonian Super League (1): 2009-10
Macedonian Cup (1): 2010

References 

1976 births
Living people
RK Zamet players
Macedonian male handball players
RK Vardar players